Friedrich Leitner (26 January 1874 – 3 July 1945) was a German economist.

He taught at Humbold University Berlin.

Konrad Mellerowicz studied under Leitner, then worked with him, and finally succeeded him in 1938.

Literary works 
 Die Selbstkostenberechnung industrieller Betriebe, 1905
 Bilanztechnik und Bilanzkritik, 1911
 Privatwirtschaftslehre der Unternehmung, 1915
 Wirtschaftslehre der Unternehmung, 91930

External links
 http://www.wiwi.hu-berlin.de/allgemeines/geschichte/

German economists
1874 births
1945 deaths